{{Infobox Military Unit
|unit_name= 416 Tactical Fighter Squadron
|image=No._416_Squadron_RCAF_badge.jpg
|caption=
|dates= November 18, 1941–July 6, 2006
|country= 
|branch=  Royal Canadian Air Force
|type= Aviation squadron
|size=
|motto= Ad Saltum paratus (Ready for the leap)
|battle_honours=Defence of Britain 1942-44;  English Channel and North Sea 1943;  Fortress Europe 1942-44;  Dieppe;  France and Germany 1944-45;  Normandy 1944;  Arnhem;  Rhine;  Gulf and Kuwait.

|aircraft_fighter= CF-18 Hornet
}}

416 "City of Oshawa" Tactical Fighter Squadron (416 TFS) was a unit of the Canadian Forces and the Royal Canadian Air Force. The squadron operated the CF-18 Hornet fighter jet from CFB Cold Lake in Alberta, Canada. In 2006, 416 TFS stood down and was amalgamated with 441 Tactical Fighter Squadron to form 409 Tactical Fighter Squadron.

The unit was originally formed during the Second World War as a unit of the Royal Canadian Air Force (RCAF).

History
No. 416 Squadron RCAF was formed at RAF Peterhead, Aberdeenshire, Scotland in 1941 as a fighter squadron for service during the Second World War and was based at various RAF stations in Scotland, England and continental Europe. The squadron was disbanded in March 1946.
The squadron was reformed in 1952 at RCAF Uplands in Ottawa, Ontario for operations in Europe as part of Canada's Cold War presence. The squadron was located at Grostenquin, France. By 1957, the squadron was relocated to Canada at RCAF St Hubert near Montreal as an air defence squadron flying Avro Canada CF-100 all weather fighters.  In 1962, the CF-100s were replaced with the CF-101 Voodoo and the squadron was moved to RCAF Chatham, New Brunswick, where they flew the interceptor until the end of 1984.  416 Squadron thus became the world's last front-line unit flying Voodoos.

In 1988 the squadron relocated to CFB Cold Lake as a Tactical Fighter Squadron flying CF-188s, and later merged with 441 Tactical Fighter Squadron to reform 409 Tactical Fighter Squadron in 2006.

The squadron's nickname was City of Oshawa, Lynx.

Battle honours
 Defence of Britain 1942-44
 English Channel and North Sea 1943
 Fortress Europe 1942-44
 Dieppe
 France and Germany 1944-45
 Normandy 1944
 Arnhem
 Rhine
 Gulf and Kuwait

Aircraft
 Supermarine Spitfire
 North American P-51 Mustang
 Canadair CT-133 Silver Star
 Canadair Sabre (Mk.2, Mk.5 and Mk.6)
 Avro Canada CF-100 Avro Canada CF-100
 McDonnell Douglas CF-101 Voodoo
 McDonnell Douglas CF-18 Hornet

References
Notes

Bibliography

 Hitchens, F.H.; Hovey, H. Richard; Schmidt, Don; McNamaee, Harold (eds). 416 Squadron: Complete History 416 Squadron. Ottawa, Ontario, Canada: Graphic Arts, 1974. (Limited edition of 300 books). Republished by Hangar Bookshelf (1987).
 Johnson, Rick with Hitchens, F.H.; Hovey, H. Richard; Schmidt, Don; McNamaee, Harold. 416 Squadron History''. Belleville, Ontario, Canada: The Hangar Bookshelf, 1984. . (republished 1987)

External links
 DND – History of 416 Squadron
  History of 416 Squadron
 416 Squadron bases 1939–1945

Canadian Forces aircraft squadrons
Royal Canadian Air Force squadrons
Military units and formations disestablished in 2006
2006 disestablishments in Alberta